The 1974 IAAF World Cross Country Championships was held in Monza, Italy, at the Mirabello Racecourse on 16 March 1974. A report on the event was given in the Glasgow Herald.

Complete results for men, junior men, women, medallists, 
 and the results of British athletes were published.

Medallists

Race results

Senior men's race (12 km)

Individual

Team

Note: Athletes in parentheses did not score for the team result

Junior men's race (7 km)

Individual

Team

Note: Athletes in parentheses did not score for the team result

Senior women's race (4 km)

Note: Athletes in parentheses did not score for the team result

Medal table (unofficial)

Note: Totals include both individual and team medals, with medals in the team competition counting as one medal.

Participation
An unofficial count yields the participation of 269 athletes from 23 countries.

 (4)
 (19)
 (1)
 (6)
 (20)
 (10)
 (21)
 (20)
 (21)
 (6)
 (14)
 (7)
 (10)
 (3)
 (6)
 (21)
 (21)
 (3)
 (6)
 (6)
 (12)
 (13)
 (19)

See also
 1974 IAAF World Cross Country Championships – Senior men's race
 1974 IAAF World Cross Country Championships – Junior men's race
 1974 IAAF World Cross Country Championships – Senior women's race
 1974 in athletics (track and field)

References

External links 
GBRathletics

 
World Athletics Cross Country Championships
C
IAAF World Cross Country Championships
International athletics competitions hosted by Italy
Cross country running in Italy
Sport in Monza
March 1974 sports events in Europe